The Night Stalker is a 2016 American drama film about the serial killer Richard Ramirez. It was directed by Megan Griffiths, who wrote the screenplay, and stars Lou Diamond Phillips, Bellamy Young, Chelle Sherrill, and Benjamin Barrett. The film was produced by Alisa Tager and Matthew Brady.

Plot 
In Texas, a drifter faces the death penalty in just a few days. His only hope is that his lawyers can persuade the serial killer Richard Ramirez to confess to the crime instead. His legal team includes Kit, who is tasked with traveling to California, and visiting Ramirez in San Quentin State Prison in an attempt to persuade him to confess. She stays in a budget hotel and spends time in a bar during her time off.

The murder in Texas took place before Ramirez's first known killing. Kit initially speaks with Ramirez by phone through glass; he refuses to reveal anything until they meet in a visitation room. There, he demands she remove her gold jewelry; he says that he is a Satanist, and gold is offensive to Satan because it is God's metal. He remains uncooperative because guards are in the room, but suggests that they can have privacy if she says she's his lawyer. Even then he remains uncooperative and insulting, demanding that she reveal personal details about herself to make herself interesting enough that she deserves to know more about him. As a child, she lived in the same neighborhood as one of Ramirez's notorious crimes, and she was obsessed with his crime spree, which was one of her inspirations to become a lawyer.

Cast

Release
The Night Stalker premiered on June 4, 2016 at the Seattle International Film Festival.

References

External links
 
 

2016 films
American crime films
2016 crime films
Films about Richard Ramirez
Biographical films about serial killers
2010s English-language films
2010s American films